Numerica Credit Union (formerly Spokane Railway Credit Union) is a credit union founded in 1937. Numerica serves the Spokane, Tri-Cities, and Wenatchee Valley regions of Washington state, as well as the North Idaho Panhandle. It is regulated under the authority of the National Credit Union Administration (NCUA). As of June 2022, Numerica managed over $3.5 billion in assets and served more than 169,000 members. Numerica’s headquarters are located in Spokane Valley, Washington.

History 

The credit union was founded in 1937 under the name Spokane Railway Credit Union.  Initially, Numerica only served Spokane railway employees, but it expanded to serve other sectors of the transportation industry, and eventually opened its doors to all residents of Washington State and the Northern Idaho Panhandle.

Awards 
In 2021, Numerica was named the Best Place to Work in the Inland Northwest in the large business category by the Spokane Journal of Business.
Numerica’s SBA team was honored in 2020 as Outstanding Community Lender for the U.S. Small Business Administration’s Seattle District for closing the most standard SBA loans in a fiscal year.
Numerica also received the Crystal Performance Award in 2020 and 2021, an annual recognition of “industry standard-setting credit unions,” according to Raddon, the financial industry research and analysis arm of Fiserv. The credit union was selected based on an analysis of key performance metrics focused on service, member relationships, sales, and other areas as observed within the Performance Analytics program from Raddon.

See also
Cannabis banking in Washington (state)

References

External links
Numerica Credit Union web site

Credit unions based in Washington (state)
Spokane Valley, Washington